Robert Rooney (1937–2017) was an artist and art critic from Melbourne, Australia, and a leading figure in Australian Conceptual art.

Biography 
Born in Melbourne on 24 September 1937, Rooney lived in Northcote until December 1939 when he moved to Broomfield Road, East Hawthorn. He trained at Swinburne College of Technology, Melbourne from 1954 to 1957, then at Preston Institute of Technology (Phillip Institute), Preston, between 1972 and 1973. His early work was hard-edged abstraction based on cereal packets, knitting patterns and suburban design for which, by the early 1960s, he had become well known, and for which he gained national recognition with his inclusion in the seminal exhibition of colour field painting The Field exhibited at the National Gallery of Victoria, Melbourne and Art Gallery of New South Wales in 1968.

From 1969 to 1981 Rooney turned his attention to systematic photographic observation in a conceptual art mode, prior to which, from 1954 to 1963 he had used a Box Brownie camera to take photographs as references for his paintings, drawings and prints. Rooney, who stopped taking the serial photographs in 1975, said ‘I don’t particularly like photographer’s photographs.’. After this period he returned to painting In 1982 with ‘The Red Card, Australia’, 1944—45’ based on a Communist Party membership card he found in a book 20 years earlier. He continued plays on such printed ephemera, and it was included by Paul Taylor in Popism, a major exhibition at the NGV of Post-Pop art.

Rooney wrote extensively on Australian art as critic for The Age (1980-July 1982) and as Melbourne Art Critic for The Australian (October 1982–99). He died on 21 March 2017.

Selected exhibitions 
 2013 Robert Rooney, the Box Brownie Years 1956–58, Centre for Contemporary Photography, Melbourne.
 2012 Play, National Gallery of Australia, Canberra.
 2010 Endless Present: Robert Rooney and Conceptual Art, National Gallery of Victoria, Melbourne. Retrospective with context provided by art donated from his collection of local and international conceptual art contemporary to the time.
 2009 Cubism and Australian Art, Heide Museum of Modern Art, Melbourne.
 1990 The Readymade Boomerang: Certain Relations in 20th Century Art, 8th Biennale of Sydney.
 1971 4 Conceptual Artists: Mel Ramsden, Ian Burn, Joseph Kosuth, Robert Rooney, Pinacotheca, Melbourne, with catalogue by Rooney.
 1968 The Field, National Gallery of Victoria, Melbourne and Art Gallery of New South Wales in 1968, seminal exhibition introducing international colour field painting into Australia.

Between 12 November 2010 and 27 March 2011, the National Gallery of Victoria held a retrospective of Rooney's work, titled 'Endless Present', w

Collections
Rooney's work is held in a number of state, regional and university collections, including:
 National Gallery of Australia, Canberra
 National Gallery of Victoria, Melbourne
 Art Gallery of New South Wales, Sydney
 Art Gallery of South Australia, Adelaide
 Art Gallery of Western Australia, Perth
 Queensland Art Gallery, Brisbane.

References

Bibliography
 Allen, T. Cross-Currents in Contemporary Australian Art, Craftsman House, 2001
 Allen, C. Art in Australia: From Colonization to Postmodernism’, Thames and Hudson, 1997
 Allen, C. Conceptual Ascetic, Review, Weekend Australian, 5–6 February 2011
 Allen, F. Portraits of an artist, The Herald-Sun, 7 March 2001
 Barlow, G; Delaney, M; & McFarlane, K. (Eds.) Change – Monash University Museum of Art, Pub. MUMA, Melbourn 2010, p. 151
 Burt, W. Thirty Years of Australian Experimental Music 1963–1993, Sounds Australian: Journal of Australian Music, Autumn 1993
 Butler, R. A Secret History of Australian Art, Craftsman House, 2002
 Campbell, J. Wide-Eyed: Melbourne, the US and Back Again, interview with Robert Rooney, John Campbell's Greatest Hits Vol. 1 (catalogue) Glen Eira City Gallery, 1999
 Catalano, G. Building a Picture: Interviews with Australian Artists, McGraw-Hill, Australia, 1997
 Catalano, G. Who's the Artist? Gary Catalano interview with Robert Rooney, Art Monthly Australia, June 1994
 Catalano, G. Rooney retrospective reveals the enigma of a straight-shooter, The Age, 7 November 1990
 Clabburn, A. Bizarreness seen as if for the first time, The Australian, 19 February 2001
 Clement, T. Robert Rooney: Balletomania Australian Art Collector, Issue 37 – July – September 2006. p. 255
 Colquhoun, B. The Lure of Light, interview with Robert Rooney, Art and Australia, 39/2, 2001
 Crawford, A. Acquisitions in Australian Art Collector, Issue 47 – January–March 2009, pp. 134–135
 Creagh, S. Open Gallery Sydney Morning Herald Spectrum 26–27 August 2006, p. 16
 Crombie, I & Blainey, G. Sites of the Imagination: Contemporary Photographers View Melbourne and its People, National Gallery of Victoria, 1992
 Duncan, J. From the Homefront: Robert Rooney: Works 1953–1988, catalogue, Monash University Gallery, 1990
 Engberg, J. Downtown: Ruscha, Rooney, Arkley, catalogue, Museum of Modern Art at Heide, 1995
 Ferber, S., Healy, C. & McAuliffe, C. (ed). Beasts of Suburbia, Melbourne University Press, 1994
 Flynn, P. Endless Present, Artist Profile, issue 14, 2011
 Gennochio, B. (ed.). The Art of Persuasion: Australian Art Criticism 1950–2001, Craftsman House, 2003
 Gennochio, B. Accenting the Minimal, Weekend Australian, 1–2 February 2003
 Gibson, J. Los Melbos, Art & Text 51, 1995
 Gollings, J. & Mchell, G. New Australian Style, Thames & Hudson, 1999
 Grishin, S. Australian Identities in Printmaking: The Print Collection of the Wagga Wagga Regional Art Gallery, Wagga Wagga Regional Art Gallery, NSW, 2000
 Green, C. & Smith, J. (curators). Fieldwork: Australian Art 1968–2002, catalogue, Ian Potter Centre: NGV, Australia, 2002
 Green, C. Have a Nice Day Mr. Rooney, Art/Text 66, 1999
 Green, C. Pinacotheca, Art and Australia, 34:4, 1997
 Green, C. Downtown: Arkley, Rooney, Ruscha, Artforum, November 1995
 Green, C. Robert Rooney, Art & Text 47, January 1994
 Grey, A. (ed). Australian Art in the National Gallery of Australia, National Gallery of Australia, 2002
 Harding L, Cramer, S, Cubism and Australian Art, Heide Museum of Modern Art, Melbourne, 2010
 Hartigan, P., Robert Rooney's out of the ordinary photography, That Saturday Paper, September 27, 2014 http://www.thesaturdaypaper.com.au/2014/09/27/robert-rooneys-out-the-ordinary-photography/14117400001026#.VC9ZrvmSxPc
 Hay, A. (ed.). The perfect Week, The Bulletin, 20 February 2001
 Heathcote, C. Manhattan to Bloomsbury, Art Monthly Australia, Dec/Jan 1990/1991
 Heathcote, C. What do artists look forward to after the retrospective, The Age, 13 November 1991
 Heathcote, C. Visual art speaks where words fail, The Age, 8 October 1993
 Holt, S. & Murray, J. Luna Park and the Art of Mass Delirium, catalogue, Museum of Modern Art at Heide, 1998–1999
 Holt, S. Just for Fun: Images of Luna Park and St Kilda, Art and Australia, 34:4, 1997
 Hutchinson, N. Missing in action, The Sydney Morning Herald, June 16–17, 2001
 James, B. Culture of a dynamic era, The Age, 6 September 1995
 Kidd, C. Give Me Five, Artforce, summer, 1999/2000
 Koop, S. (ed.) A Small History of Photography, Centre for Contemporary Photography, 1997
 Lancashire, R. Painting of the Week: No: 8, What Price Victory? (1983), Robert Rooney’, The Age, 21 May 2002
 Lower, L.A. Robert Rooney, review, The Sydney Morning Herald, 25–26 October 2003
 Lynn, E. Double Vision, The Australian, 17 February 1995
 Makin, J. The way of all flesh, The Herald Sun, 17 June 2002
 Mendelssohn, J. 1968, PRIMAVERA, The Australian, 15 September 1995
 McAuliffe, C. & Yule, P. (eds.). Treasures: Highlights of the Cultural Collections of the University of Melbourne, Miegunyah Press, 2003
 McAuliffe, C. Art and Suburbia, Craftsman House, 1996
 McCulloch, S. Focus on structure: Highlighting our modern past, The Australian Financial Review, 23 March 2006
 McCulloch, S. DOWNTOWN, The Australian, 24 March 1995
 McDonald, K. Contemporary print collecting: Melbourne's print workshops and publishers, Art and Australia, 40:2, 2002
 McDonald, E. & Annear, J (eds.). What is This Thing Called Photography?: Australian Photography 1975-1985, Pluto Press, 2000
 McKenzie, B. & Phipps, J. Artists and wunderkinds, Artlink, 21:2, 2001
 McKenzie, R. Women still firmly in the picture, The Age, 27 December 1995
 McKenzie, R. Downtown: Ruscha, Rooney, Arkley, The Age, 29 March 1995
 Michael, L.. 21st Century Modern: 2006 Adelaide Biennial of Australian Art, catalogue essay, exhibition catalogue, Art Gallery of South Australia, 2006
 Michael, L. The Monash University Collection: People, Places and Ideas: Four Decades of Collection, catalogue, Monash University Museum of Art, 2002
 Moore, C. Museum Hygiene, Photofile, March 1994
 Morrell, T. Post Mortem Ante Facto, Broadsheet Vol. 33 No. 2, pp. 76–77
 Murray Cree, L. & Drury, N (eds.). Australian Painting Now, Craftsman House, 2000
 Nelson, R. Contemporary artists upstaging with understatement, The Age, 4 October 1995
 Nelson, R. Blockbuster to schlockbuster, The Age, 27 December 1995
 Nelson, R. Drawing on child art, The Age, 14 February 2001
 Nelson, R. Imaginative life of children inspires, The Age, 8 June 2002
 Nelson, R. Colouring Modern Life, The Age, 16 December 2003
 Nelson, R. The high art of the routine, The Age, 8 February 2011
 Neville, G. Quirky, offbeat look at the banal, The Age, 26 October 1990
 Nicholson, H. Avant-Gardism for Children, catalogue, University Art Museum, The University of Queensland, 1999
 Palmer, D. The order of things: the edition and the series in contemporary photomedia, Photophile 67, December 2002
 Pestorius, D. Geometric Painting in Australia 1941–1997, catalogue, University Art Museum, The University of Queensland, 1997
 Preston, E. Howard Arkley: Not Just a Suburban Boy, Duffy and Snellgrove, 2002
 Queensland Art Gallery, Queensland Art Gallery: Collection Souvenir, Queensland Art Gallery, 1996
 Reid, B. & Underhill, N. (eds.) Letters to John Reed: Defining Australian Cultural Life 1920–1981, Viking, 2001
 Rhodes, K. The Camera is a Dumb Recording Device; Robert Rooney and the serial photographs in retrospective
 Rogers, J. The Art of Knitting, Angus & Robertson, 1991
 Rooney, R. Robert Rooney, 21st Century Modern: 2006 Adelaide Biennial of Australian Art catalogue essay, exhibition catalogue, Art Gallery of South Australia, 2006
 Simpson, K. Memories are made of this, The Herald Sun, 21 March 1995
 Smith, T. Transformation in Australian Art, Volume Two: The Twentieth Century – Modernism and Aboriginality, Craftsman House, 2002 
 Stanhope, Z. The Persistence of Pop: Works from the Monash University Collection, catalogue, Monash University Gallery, 1999
 Thomas, D. Melbourne Modern: The Art of Robert Rooney, Art and Australia, 34:4, 1997
 Tomas, D. Golden oldies: four artists who were new and exciting in the 1960s and early 1970s and are still going strong, Art and Australia, 50:4, 2013
 Tobacco, W. Robert Rooney: Now and Then, Imprint, 37:3, Spring 2002
 Tonkin, S. When visual and performing arts align, Silver lined – Contemporary artists and the Performing Arts Collection exhibition catalogue, The Arts Centre, Melbourne, Australia, 2008
 Virgo, A. Australia: Limited Edition Prints, catalogue, The 16th Asian International Art Exhibition, Australian Print Workshop, 2001
 Wadelton, D. From ‘Red Rattlers’ to Lara Croft, Interview with Robert Rooney, Art and Australia, 38/2, 2000
 Whiteoak, J. & Scott-Maxwell, A. (eds.). Currency Companion to Music and Dance in Australia, Currency House, 2003
 Whiteoak, J. Playing ad Lib: Improvisatory Music in Australia 1836–1970, Currency Press, 1999
 Whiteoak, J. Melbourne Leads the Revolution, La Trobe Bulletin, September 1994
 Zimmer, J. From the Homefront: Robert Rooney 1953–88, Art and Australia, 28:4, 1991
 Zimmer, J. In an Artist's Obsessive Zone, The Herald, 11 November 1990

External links 
 Biography/CV - on the Darren Knight Gallery website.
 The High Art of the Routine - Review of 'Endless Present', from The Age.
 Untitled: Portraits of Australian Artists - Chapter on Robert Rooney, at Academia.edu

1937 births
2017 deaths
Australian painters
Australian art critics
Australian photographers